Song Seung-jun (Hangul: 송승준, Hanja: 宋勝準) (born June 29, 1980 in Busan, South Korea) is a South Korean former professional baseball player. A pitcher, Song played for the Lotte Giants in the Korea Baseball Organization. Prior to playing for Lotte, Song played minor league baseball in the United States from 1999 through 2006. He bats and throws right-handed. Song's bread-and-butter pitch is a forkball.

Amateur career
Song attended Kyungnam High School in Busan, South Korea. In September 1998, he was selected for the South Korean national junior team, and participated in the 3rd Asian Junior Baseball Championship in Osaka, Japan, along with Baek Cha-Seung, Lee Jong-Wook and Lee Jin-Young.  He helped lead the baseball team to the Korean national high school championship in 1998.

Notable international careers

Professional career

Minor League Baseball 
Though Song was the first overall selection in the Korea Baseball Organization (KBO) amateur draft, Song signed with the Boston Red Sox of Major League Baseball as an amateur free agent in February 1999, receiving a $800,000 signing bonus. He started his professional career in the Rookie-level Gulf Coast League (GCL) with the GCL Red Sox that season. He pitched for the Lowell Spinners of the Class A-Short Season New York–Pennsylvania League in 2000.

In 2001, Song began the season with the Augusta GreenJackets of the Class A South Atlantic League (SAL), earning the victory in the SAL All-Star Game. He received a promotion to the Sarasota Red Sox of the Class A-Advanced Florida State League on his 21st birthday. He finished the season with a 1.90 earned run average, finishing second in minor league baseball behind Josh Beckett, and 135 strikeouts in 138 innings pitched. He was named Minor League Player of the Year by Baseball America. He also competed in the 2001 All-Star Futures Game as a member of World Team.

Prior to the 2002 season, Song was rated as the 60th-best prospect in baseball by Baseball America. In 2002, he played for the Trenton Thunder of the Class AA Eastern League, and competed in the 2002 All-Star Futures Game. That season, the Boston Red Sox traded Song to the Montreal Expos with Sun-Woo Kim for Cliff Floyd.

In April 2003, while pitching for the Harrisburg Senators, the Expos' Class AA affiliate in the Eastern League, Song threw a no-hitter. He was selected again as a member of World Team for the 2003 All-Star Futures Game. This made Song the first three-time participant in the All-Star Futures Game. Later that year, the Expos attempted to trade Song and Josh McKinley to the Texas Rangers for Juan González, but Gonzalez used a no-trade clause in his contract to block the deal. In 2004, the Expos optioned Song to the Edmonton Trappers of the Class AAA Pacific Coast League.

After the 2004 season, the Toronto Blue Jays claimed Song off of waivers. In 2005, he pitched for the San Francisco Giants organization. In 2006, he pitched for the Wichita Wranglers, the Kansas City Royals' Class AA affiliate, in the Texas League. He appeared in the Texas League All-Star Game.

KBO League 
Song transferred to the Lotte Giants of the KBO, who signed him to one-year contract for $300,000 in March 2007. Song led the Giants in wins in 2010, and was selected to start the first game of the playoffs. Between 2008 and 2011, Song won at least 12 games a year for the Giants. In 2012, he was named a starter in the KBO All-Star Game, as the fans voted for ten Giants as starters.

In 2016, he grade down in 1st major in Lotte. Because of his Fascia rupture, his doctor said that he will need to cure of two weeks.

International career
Song was named to the preliminary roster for the 2008 Beijing Olympic Games in July 2007, and made the final 24-man roster in July 2008, his first major international competition. Song started two games at the Olympics. On August 14, he pitched six scoreless innings against the Chinese national baseball team, giving up only two hits while striking out nine. On August 19, Song pitched  innings against Cuban national baseball team, allowing three runs and five hits to earn the win for South Korea.

Notable international careers

Filmography

Television show

See also 
 List of KBO career win leaders
 List of KBO career strikeout leaders

References

External links 

 Career statistics and player information from MyKBOStats.com

1980 births
2013 World Baseball Classic players
Augusta GreenJackets players
Baseball players at the 2008 Summer Olympics
Brevard County Manatees players
Edmonton Trappers players
Fresno Giants players
Gulf Coast Expos players
Gulf Coast Red Sox players
Harrisburg Senators players
Kyungnam High School alumni
Living people
Lotte Giants players
Lowell Spinners players
Medalists at the 2008 Summer Olympics
Norwich Navigators players
Olympic baseball players of South Korea
Olympic gold medalists for South Korea
Olympic medalists in baseball
San Jose Giants players
Sarasota Red Sox players
South Korean expatriate baseball players in Canada
South Korean expatriate baseball players in the United States
Trenton Thunder players
Wichita Wranglers players
Eunjin Song clan
South Korean Buddhists
Sportspeople from Busan